The 2014–2015 Israeli Basketball Super League, for sponsorships reasons known as Ligat Winner Basketball, was the 61st season of the Israeli Basketball Premier League. The season began on October 12, 2014 and ended on June 25, 2014.

The season marked the first time since 1993 that Maccabi Tel Aviv did not reach the Finals, and the third time they failed to finish in either the first or second place. The season was the first time in the league's history to not include a Tel Aviv based team in the first or second place.

Hapoel Jerusalem B.C. took the Israeli title, after it beat Hapoel Eilat in the Finals.

Teams

Changes

Barak Netanya has been relegated to Ligat Leumit due to financial difficulties, Making Maccabi Ashdod stay in the league although finishing last in the previous season.
Ironi Nahariya has been promoted to the league after winning Ligat Leumit last season.

Stadia and locations

Head coaches

Regular season

Pld – Played; W – Won; L – Lost; PF – Points for; PA – Points against; Diff – Difference; Pts – Points.

Playoffs

Bracket
Small bold numbers represent the seed earned in the regular season of each team.

Quarterfinals

The Quarterfinals are played as The-Best-Of-5 series. The higher ranked team hosts games 1, 3 and 5 (if necessary). The lower ranked team hosts games 2 and 4 (if necessary).

Semifinals

The Semifinals are played The-Best-Of-5 series. The higher ranked team hosts games 1, 3 and 5 (if necessary). The lower ranked team hosts games 2 and 4 (if necessary).

Finals
The Finals series is played in a home-and-away format, with the overall cumulative score determining the champion. Thus, the score of one single game can be tied.
The team who finishes at a higher place in the regular season will host the second game.

Game 1

Game 2

All-Star Game
The 2015 Israeli League All-star event was held on 3 March 2015, at the new Holon Toto Hall in Holon.
Every team sent one foreigner and one Israeli for the respective team, with the remaining spots been selected by the League.
Maccabi Tel Aviv have been abroad for a Euroleague game, therefore their players did not compete in the event.

Three-point shootout

Slam Dunk Contest

Awards

Regular season MVP
 Lior Eliyahu (Hapoel Jerusalem)

All-BSL 1st team
 Khalif Wyatt (Hapoel Eilat)
 Shawn Dawson (Maccabi Rishon LeZion)
 Devin Smith (Maccabi Tel Aviv)
 Lior Eliyahu (Hapoel Jerusalem)
 Ike Ofoegbu (Maccabi Haifa)

Coach of the Season
  Danny Franco

Rising Star
 Shawn Dawson (Maccabi Rishon LeZion)

Best Defender
 Brian Randle (Maccabi Tel Aviv)

Most Improved Player
 Robert Rothbart (Ironi Nahariya)

Sixth Man of the Season
 Tony Gaffney (Hapoel Jerusalem)

External links
IBA's official website (Hebrew)

References

Israeli Basketball Premier League seasons
Israeli
Basketball